The non-marine molluscs of Tunisia are a part of the molluscan fauna of Tunisia (wildlife of Tunisia).

A number of species of non-marine molluscs are found in the wild in Tunisia.

Freshwater gastropods 
Neritidae
 Theodoxus meridionalis (Philippi, 1836) 

Hydrobiidae
 Belgrandiella nana (Terver, 1839) 
 Belgrandiellopsis chorfensis Khalloufi, Bejaoui & Delicado, 2020 - endemic to Tunisia
 Belgrandiellopsis secunda Khalloufi, Bejaoui & Delicado, 2020 - endemic to Tunisia
 Biserta putealis Khalloufi, Bejaoui & Delicado, 2020 - endemic to Tunisia
 Bullaregia tunisiensis Khalloufi, Bejaoui & Delicado, 2017 - endemic to Tunisia
 Bythinella limnopsis Letourneux & Bourguignat, 1887 - extinct, was endemic to Tunisia
 Bythinella mauritanica Letourneux & Bourguignat 1887 - extinct, was endemic to Tunisia
 Bythinella microcochlia Letourneux & Bourguignat, 1887 - extinct, was endemic to Tunisia
 Bythinella punica Letourneux & Bourguignat, 1887 - extinct, was endemic to Tunisia
 Hydrobia acuta (Draparnaud, 1805) 
 Hydrobia djerbaensis Wilke, Pfenninger & Davis, 2002 
 Hydrobia musaensis Frauenfeld, 1855 
 Hydrobia ventrosa (Montagu, 1803) 
 Mercuria bourguignati Glöer, Bouzid et Boeters, 2010
 Mercuria punica (Letourneux & Bourguignat, 1887)
 Mercuria saharica (Letourneux & Bourguignat, 1887)
 Pseudamnicola barratei Letourneux & Bourguignat, 1887 - extinct, was endemic to Tunisia
 Pseudamnicola doumeti Letourneux & Bourguignat, 1887 - extinct, was endemic to Tunisia
 Pseudamnicola globulina Letourneux & Bourguignat, 1887 - extinct, was endemic to Tunisia
 Pseudamnicola latasteana Letourneux & Bourguignat, 1887 - extinct, was endemic to Tunisia
 Pseudamnicola meluzzii Boeters, 1976 
 Pseudamnicola oudrefica (Letourneux & Bourguignat, 1887) - extinct, was endemic to Tunisia 
 Pseudamnicola ragia Letourneux & Bourguignat, 1887 - extinct, was endemic to Tunisia
 Pseudamnicola singularis Letourneux & Bourguignat, 1887 - extinct, was endemic to Tunisia

Thiaridae
 Melanoides tuberculata (O.F. Müller, 1774) 

Melanopsidae
 Melanopsis cariosa Linnaeus, 1767 

Cochliopidae
 Heleobia stagnorum (Gmelin, 1791) 

Potamididae
 Pirenella conica Blainville, 1829 

Assimineidae
 Paludinella globularis (Hanley, 1844) 

Lymnaeidae
 Galba truncatula (O.F. Müller, 1774) 

Physidae
 Physella acuta (Draparnaud, 1805) 

Planorbidae
 Ancylus fluviatilis O.F. Müller, 1774 
 Bulinus truncatus (Audouin, 1827) 
 Hippeutis complanatus Linnaeus, 1758

Land gastropods 
Pleurodiscidae
 Pleurodiscus balmei (Potiez & Michaud, 1838)

Pupillidae
 Pupoides coenopictus (T. Hutton, 1834)

Enidae
 Cirna micelii (Kobelt, 1885)
 Coniconapaeus milevianus (Raymond, 1853)
 Mauronapaeus terverii (Dupotet in Forbes, 1839)
 Mastus pupa (Linnaeus, 1758)

Clausiliidae
 Mauritanica cossoni (Letourneux, 1887) - endemic to Tunisia
 Mauritanica perinni Bourguignat, 1876
 Mauritanica perinni polygyra (O. Boettger, 1879) - endemic to Tunisia
 Mauritanica perinni zaghouanica Sparacio, Liberto & La Mantia, 2020 - endemic to Tunisia
 Mauritanica philora (Letourneux, 1887) - endemic to Tunisia
 Mauritanica philora philora (Letourneux, 1887) - endemic to Tunisia
 Mauritanica philora bognannii Sparacio, Liberto & La Mantia, 2020 - endemic to Tunisia
 Mauritanica tristrami (Pfeiffer, 1861) - endemic to Tunisia
 Mauritanica tristrami tristrami (Pfeiffer, 1861) - endemic to Tunisia
 Mauritanica tristrami nouirasaidi Sparacio, Liberto & La Mantia, 2020 - endemic to Tunisia
 Mauritanica tristrami zribensis Sparacio, Liberto & La Mantia, 2020 - endemic to Tunisia
 Papillifera papillaris (O.F. Müller, 1778)

Achatinidae
 Rumina decollata (Linnaeus, 1758)[53]

Milacidae
 Milax gagates (Bourguignat 1801)
 Milax gasulli Altena 1974 - endemic to Tunisia
 Milax nigricans (Philippi 1836)

Limacidae
 Limacus flavus (Linnaeus 1758)
 Lehmannia melitensis (Lessona and Pollonera 1882)

Geomitridae
 Cernuella virgata (Da Costa, 1778) 
 Cochlicella barbara (Linnaeus, 1758)
 Trochoidea elegans (Gmelin, 1791)
 Trochoidea pyramidata (Draparnaud, 1805)
 Xerocrassa latastei (Letourneux in Letourneux & Bourguignat, 1887) - endemic to Tunisia
 Xerocrassa latasteopsis (Letourneux & Bourguignat, 1887) - endemic to Tunisia
 Xeroplana doumeti (Bouguignat, 1876) - endemic to Tunisia
 Xeroplana idia (Issel, 1885) - endemic to Tunisia

Helicidae
 Cornu aspersum (O.F. Müller, 1778)
 Eobania vermiculata (O.F. Müller, 1778)
 Eremina desertorum irregularis (Férussac, 1821)
 Helix melanostoma Draparnaud, 1801
 Helix pronuba Westerlund & Blanc, 1879
 Marmorana muralis (O. F. Müller, 1774) 
 Theba pisana (O.F. Müller, 1778)

Sphincterochilidae
 Sphincterochila candidissima (Draparnaud, 1801)
 Sphincterochila tunetana (L. Pfeiffer, 1850) - endemic to Tunisia

Trissexodontidae
 Caracollina lenticula (Férussac, 1821)

Freshwater bivalves
Unionidae
 Anodonta lucasi Deshayes, 1847
 Potomida littoralis (Cuvier, 1798)
 Unio durieui Deshayes, 1847
 Unio gibbus Spengler, 1793
 Unio ravoisieri Deshayes, 1848 

Sphaeriidae
 Pisidium casertanum (Poli, 1791)

See also
Lists of molluscs of surrounding countries:
 List of non-marine molluscs of Libya, Wildlife of Libya
 List of non-marine molluscs of Algeria, Wildlife of Algeria

oversea countries:
 List of non-marine molluscs of Italy, Wildlife of Italy
 List of non-marine molluscs of Malta, Wildlife of Malta

References

 Non marine moll

Molluscs
Tunisia
Tunisia